"(You Can Still) Rock in America" is a song written by Jack Blades and Brad Gillis, and the first single released from Night Ranger's 1983 album Midnight Madness. Former Deep Purple and Black Sabbath singer Glenn Hughes contribute backing vocals on the song.

Background
Night Ranger were on tour in Springfield, Illinois with Sammy Hagar in 1983. Singer Jack Blades bought several music magazines in town on his day off, many of which proclaimed "rock is dead" in favor of new wave artists like Thompson Twins or the Cure. Blades refused to believe it, as his band and Sammy Hagar had played so many concerts on their tour with thousands of screaming fans who seemed to think rock and roll was still very much alive. He came up with the chorus first, and then wrote some verses based on what fans would tell him about the lengths they went to to attend rock concerts. "So I just took this one girl's idea of what she was telling me, and I wrote that as a commentary on what I was seeing out there when everybody was saying rock was dead. And that ended up being sort of an anthem for Night Ranger, for sure," said Blades.

Track listing

Personnel
Night Ranger

 Jack Blades – bass, lead vocals
Alan Fitzgerald – keyboards
 Brad Gillis – guitars, vocals
 Kelly Keagy – drums, vocals
 Jeff Watson – guitars, vocals

Additional musicians

Glenn Hughes – backing vocals on "(You Can Still) Rock in America"

Charts

In popular culture
A re-recording of the song is downloadable content for Rock Band 2 and is a playable track on Guitar Hero: Warriors of Rock.

"(You Can Still) Rock in America" was the opening credits theme song for the television series Rock 'N' America.

A snippet plays during the series finale of The Drew Carey Show.

References

1983 songs
1983 singles
Night Ranger songs
MCA Records singles
Songs written by Jack Blades
Songs about the United States